"Narrow cloth" (streit, strait, narrow ware articles, narrow ware woven) is cloth of a comparatively narrow width, generally less than a human armspan; precise definitions vary. 

Historically, human factors and ergonomics limited the width that could practically be woven by a single weaver on a handloom. The weaver had to be able to reach both edges of the cloth, so they could throw the shuttle through the shed. A weaver thus could not weave a bolt wider than their armspan. So cloth was typically made in narrow widths on 
narrow-width handlooms.

Wider widths once had to be woven with a person on each side of the loom, usually the master weaver and an apprentice, throwing the shuttle back and forth between them. In 1733, the flying shuttle was invented. Flying shuttles made it possible for a single hand weaver to weave widths greater than their armspan, halving the labour required to make broadcloth. Fabric widths became limited by the impracticality of transporting very wide bolts and looms.

Various maximum measures of breadth were used to legally define narrow cloth, and "broadcloth" was often regulated to be twice the width of narrow cloth . The word "broadcloth" was originally used just as an antonym to "narrow cloth", but later came to mean a particular type of cloth (see broadcloth). The 1909 Webster's dictionary (as reprinted in 1913) defines broadcloth as "A fine smooth-faced woolen cloth for men's garments, usually of double width". thus giving both the old breadth-based distinction and the newer definition based on the type of cloth. Broadwoven and narrow woven are unambiguous terms, used by the US government.

Significance 
The narrow cloth had several variations and was famous as like broadcloths; due to the narrower width, they were less prone to shrinkage and thus required less milling.

Historic trade definitions 
In England, efforts were made to standardize the width of cloth, to promote mercery. The first on record is the Assize of Cloth (also called the Assize of Measures), which was first introduced in the reign of Richard I (1189 - 1199). It defined two English ells (then ) as the only legal breadth for woolen cloth. Article 35 of the Magna Carta reaffirmed this standard; it said "There shall be standard measures of wine, ale, and corn (the London quarter), throughout the kingdom. There shall also be a standard width of dyed [generally wollen] cloth, russet, and haberject, namely two ells within the selvedges. Weights are to be standardised similarly." In the reign of Edward I (1272 - 1307), an official called the king's alnager was appointed to enforce the law, and all towns were required to have an accurate ellwand (measuring stick one ell in length). These rules were repealed in 1353, because imports and varying types of wool made them impractical. In 1665, in the reign of Charles II, the office of alnager was revived. The office of the alnager was abolished again in 1699. See Weights and Measures Acts (UK)#England for details.

In the late-sixteen- and seventeen-hundreds, English merchants exported broadcloth to both the Levant and the Indies. Anything narrower was narrow cloth.

James Bischoff noted in his 1842 publication, A Comprehensive History of the Woollen, and Worsted Manufactures, that British woolens were imported into Ireland with two different descriptions, broadcloth and narrow cloth. These were priced (per yard length) at six shillings fourpence and three shillings eightpence, respectively. He did not mention whether the two were distinguished by width, but the doubling of price suggests that broadcloth was similar to narrow cloth except for being twice the width.

In the 1990s, the US government defined "broadwoven fabrics" and "narrow woven fabrics", with a breadth cutoff of 30 centimeters (about 12 inches) (per the Harmonized Tariff Schedule of the United States). By this definition, the US government estimates that 70-75% of all cloth production globally, by weight, is broadwoven.

Types and uses 
Narrow-loom cloth is still made by in artisanal weaving. Traditional-format textiles in narrow widths are also machine-made. These are used from making traditional garments and other traditional textile items.

References

External links
Freund, Kimberlie and Norton, Marjorie J.T., Broadwoven Fabrics, USITC Publication 3410: 4 . Free public-domain fulltext.

Woven fabrics